The New Testament Household Codes (in German nicknamed Haustafeln), also known as New Testament Domestic Codes, consist of instructions in New Testament writings associated with the apostles Paul and Peter to pairs of Christian people within the structure of a typical Roman household. The main foci of the Household Codes are upon husband/wife, parent (father)/child, and master/slave relationships. The Codes apparently were developed to urge the new first century Christians to comply with the non-negotiable requirements of Roman Patria Potestas law, and to meet the needs for order within the fledgling churches. The two main texts that address these relationships and duties are Ephesians  and Colossians . Historically, proof texts from the New Testament Household Codes—from the first century to the present day—have been used to define a married Christian woman's role in relation to her husband, and to disqualify women from primary ministry positions in Christian churches.

The term Haustafel
The German word Haustafel ("house table"), plural Haustafeln, refers to a summary table of specific actions members of each domestic pair in a household are expected to perform. The term is said to have been coined by Martin Luther. A Haustafel is included in Luther's Small Catechism.

Historical setting
According to certain studies, the public life of women in the time of Jesus was far more restricted than in Old Testament times. At the time the apostles were writing their letters concerning the Household Codes (Haustafeln), Roman law vested enormous power (Patria Potestas, lit. "the rule of the fathers") in the husband over his "family" (pater familias) which included his wife, children, agnatic descendants, slaves, and freedmen. Originally this power was absolute and included the power of life and death. He could acknowledge, banish, kill, or disown a child. A first-century jurist recounts the story of a man beating his wife to death because she had drunk some wine. His neighbors approved.

Church-state relations in the Roman Empire at the time were far from ideal.
 The Christians rejected ancestral pagan customs and Hellenistic religions.
 Christian preaching about a new king Jesus sounded like revolution.
 Christians were often very unpopular and severe religious persecution of them had begun.
 Paul's success at Ephesus had provoked a riot to defend the cult of the goddess Artemis.
 In 64 AD, the Great Fire of Rome destroyed over seventy percent of Rome. A rumor had gone forth which accused Nero of starting the fire himself, and that he had even sung a song from his Palace tower as he watched the flames engulf the city. At that time Christians were a rather obscure religious sect with a small following in the city. To "suppress this rumor" according to Tacitus, Nero blamed the Christians and killed a “vast multitude” of them as scapegoats. Nero supported widespread persecution of Christians, including having his victims fed to the lions during giant spectacles held in the city's remaining amphitheater. He took pleasure in the Christian persecutions and even offered many of them upon stakes to be burned to death as torches for his parties. Many others of them were sewn into skins of animals and fed to starving dogs while the mob cheered.

Sources of the concept
In a Tübingen dissertation, James E. Crouch identifies  as the earliest traceable form of the Christian Household Code, with further developments being found in Ephesians, the pastorals, and 1 Peter (as well as in early patristic literature: 1 Clement, Polycarp, Didache, and Barnabas). Crouch concludes that the early Christians found in Hellenistic Judaism a Code which they adapted and Christianized.

The concept of Household Codes was borrowed from Greek and Roman ethics, according to Suzanne Henderson. She notes that over the past century, scholars have identified a range of parallels between the Colossians Household Code and the writings of the Greco-Roman world. She writes that Martin Dibelius emphasized the influence of Stoic thought, while others have argued that the Code "bears the influence of Hellenistic Jewish writers such as Philo and Josephus.

Stagg writes:
"The form of the Code stressing reciprocal social duties is traced to Judaism's own Oriental background, with its strong moral/ethical demand but also with a low view of woman.... At bottom is probably to be seen the perennial tension between freedom and order.... What mattered to (Paul) was 'a new creation' and 'in Christ' there is 'not any Jew not Greek, not any slave nor free, not any male and female.

Intent of the Codes
Various theologians have assorted opinions as to why the apostles wrote the Codes in the first place, and then why they were directed to a variety of recipients in several New Testament passages. Some believe that the intent of the Codes is not universal throughout the passages in which they appear. They believe it necessary to determine the specific function of a Code within a specific New Testament passage. Timothy Gombis posits that the most important factor in determining the purpose of the Code is to consider the literary context in which it appears.
 An apologetic thrust
 For order within churches and society
 To humanize antagonistic domestic relationships
 Responsibility and mutual respect
 Manifesto for maintaining hierarchical attitudes

Though the suggested intents have some common threads, the following are what appear to be the predominant theories of the original intent of the Household Codes of Paul and Peter:

An apologetic thrust 
Margaret MacDonald argues that the Haustafel, particularly as it appears in Ephesians, was aimed at “reducing the tension between community members and outsiders.”

The early Christian Church, from its inception until the persecution under Nero in 64 AD, was tolerated by the Roman authorities who regarded it as merely another Jewish sect.
The relationship between the Church and Judaism was far more tempestuous as can be seen within the Acts of the Apostles. Prior to the burning of Rome, their persecution was from the Jews. The Christians were regarded by both the common people and the authorities as being separatists. The Christian lifestyle itself distanced it from that of the pagan world.

During the first centuries, imperial Roman authorities considered Christian loyalty to Christ as disloyalty to their state. Toivo Pilli reports that the vast majority of Rome’s citizens and subjects experienced no burden of conscience even to public human sacrifices. The views of Christians tended to be seen quite differently since they added theological and ethical evaluation to all civil acts. When Christians opposed an imperial cult, they were deemed to have denied the emperor’s right to rule. Toivo Pilli writes how Pliny the Younger (61 AD – ca. 112 AD) explained his policy for dealing with Christians:
If for three times they did not deny being Christians, he sentenced them to death, because "whatever kind of crime it may be to which they have confessed, their pertinacity and inflexible obstinacy should certainly be punished".

Pilli argues that Christians may have taken too literally the attitude of the first apostles: "We must obey God rather than men".

Theologian Timothy Gombis, in his scholarly article about the Haustafel in Ephesians, says that biblical scholars have typically treated it as a resource in the debate over the role of women in ministry and in the home. Without agreeing with that view, Gombis finds that most scholars regard the Haustafel to have an apologetic thrust in Ephesians. This majority view is that Paul was attempting to shield the new Christian movement from the suspicion that it might undermine contemporary social structures and ultimately threaten the stability of the Roman empire. Gombis cites Craig Keener as claiming that:
“groups accused of undermining the moral fabric of Roman society thus sometimes protested that they instead conformed to traditional Roman values, by producing their own lists, or ‘Household Codes’, fitting those normally used in their day.”
Balch concludes that both Philo and Josephus used similar strategies when facing accusations that Jewish proselytism was ruining the social fabric of Roman society.

For order within churches and society
Commentators have noted similarities between the New Testament Household Codes and Aristotle's discussion of families in Book One of Politics. The Aristotelian tradition specified that "the first and least parts of a family are master and slave, husband and wife, father and children"
David Balch maintains that "the Household Codes in Ephesians and Colossians clearly reflect the choice of an Aristotelian tradition of discourse on Household management" and that the structure of the Ephesians passage "is similar to Aristotle's discussion of the Household in Book One of Politics: three pairs of social classes (husbands/wives, parents/children, masters/slaves), with the classes reciprocally related, and one class in each pair ruling, while the other is to be ruled." Others, however, suggest that the New Testament Household Codes are significantly different from their predecessors, in that they "do not give absolute power to the men, but instead require a high degree of responsibility and mutual respect for all members of Christian families." However, Elliott disagrees, seeing "the Household Codes" as a call for Christians to live counter-culturally from their surroundings, with 1 Peter 2:13-3:12 used to counter assimilation, that some were in danger of because of the suffering they were going through 

New Testament scholar Frank Stagg finds the basic tenets of the Code in Aristotle's discussion of the household in Book One of Politics as well as in Philo's Hypothetica 7.14. He believes the several occurrences of the Code in the New Testament were intended to meet the needs for order within the churches and in the society of the day, essentially restraints to meet the threats of moral anarchy. Labeling it as libertinism, Stagg envisions a scenario in which for some of Paul's hearers, particularly women and slaves, being freed from "The Law" was an invitation to reject all restraint.

Similarly, Crouch concludes that the Household Code was developed to counteract the threat of a form of "enthusiasm", such as that which appeared within some of the new Christian churches, that was threatening to undermine the basic structures of first century society. Crouch comments that women and slaves, in particular, sought to extend their new-found Christian freedom to relationships outside the church as well as within it.

Galatians is considered by many scholars (including Stagg) to be one of Paul's earliest extant writings. In his own words, Paul says "I was violently persecuting the church of God and was trying to destroy it". On his way to Damascus he was confronted by the risen Jesus in a heavenly vision. According to the three separate accounts in Acts, Saul found himself on the ground, blinded by the intensity of a heavenly light. The risen Jesus gave Saul a commission to "be a light to the Gentiles". Called to be "God’s great missionary to the Gentiles", Paul also can claim what Bilezikian has termed "an inaugural statement" in the New Testament:

Because of Paul's exhortations throughout Galatians about freedom "in Christ", Galatians has been called “the Magna Carta of the Reformation” and Luther’s “Katie von Bora.” It is the book on which the Protestant Reformation was founded. F.F. Bruce writes that the purpose of this letter to the Galatian Christians was to refute the Judaizers’ false gospel—a gospel in which these Jewish Christians felt that circumcision was essential to salvation—and to remind the Galatians of the real basis of their salvation. It was the urgency of the situation which moved Paul to write even before the Jerusalem Council convened, for the churches of Galatia were at stake.

Stagg addresses the question of why so much of the Christian Household Code is found in what is generally recognized as the Pauline tradition. He points to a seeming irony that the Code in the New Testament is associated with the apostle who fought so openly and suffered such personal sacrifice for both freedom and equity for Jew and Greek, slave and free, male and female. Citing the complexities with which Paul had to deal after his historic proclamation in Galatians 3:28, Stagg concludes that the New Testament Household Code was not a simple situation in which one man "single-handedly imposed male chauvinism on Gentile churches." He suggests that Paul's strong emphases stemmed from the "perennial tension between freedom and order." Pointing out that freedom is ever at the risk of its abuse in terms of permissiveness, disorder, anarchy, or chaos, "the twin threats of legalism and libertinism are ancient and recurrent". Stagg notes that various New Testament books reflect "this ongoing struggle for a proper relationship between law and grace, gift and demand, freedom and responsibility". He conjectures that this situation must have become acute in the early churches, especially among women and slaves who had suffered most under the heaviest restraints. Therefore, they understandably would want to make the most of their new freedom "in Christ", and Stagg concludes that Paul found himself at the center of the battle.

To humanize antagonistic domestic relationships
Michael Parsons takes the stance that the apostles' goal in developing the Christian Codes was to humanize relationships which, in the society of their own day, had become "battlefields of contempt and antagonism." They did this by introducing into the "new creation" relationships that which had been lost: namely, human dignity, particularly among women and slaves. While acknowledging that the Household Codes did not originate with Christianity, he considers them being "radically transformed by the Christian authors".

He writes that the apostles used the contemporary form of the Haustafeln in their ethical instruction with "creative and imaginative pastoral insight". He does not think that the apostles, generally, are making social statements on prevailing customs. Instead, they are asking the question, "What does it mean to be 'in Christ' in this situation?" or "What is the relationship between Christian freedom and this social institution?" Parsons finds the implications to be profound. Even slaves are responsible; the possibility of living a Christian life depends solely on Christ’s grace―not circumstance.

Parsons maintains that the Haustafeln in Ephesians and Colossians are clearly written to those within the church, not those outside. Many believe that in the 2 Corinthians passage, the apostle Paul is speaking to situations of, at a minimum, potential disorder in the churches—to include the breaking of all social order. Therefore, he believes the purpose of the New Testament Household Codes likely was a call to order in an unruly church. But Parsons says whatever the overall purpose of each particular Haustafel might have been, it is certain that the paired relationships are explained by their relationship to Christ. "Correspondingly new behavior is expected from Christian believers in each of those social situations. Each member of the three pairs is equal to the other 'in Christ', but they are not to presume on that new position and make it an excuse for behaving in any unchristian manner." There is no room in an "in Christ" relationship for feelings of antagonism, of superiority and inferiority, or of dehumanizing pride.

Responsibility and mutual respect
Jesuit author Felix Just also finds similarities between many other Greco-Roman moral writings and four of the later New Testament epistles (letters). The biblical Household Codes contain instructions for particular groups of people within Christian families or "Households" as to how they should treat other members of their Household. He writes that most people in the first-century Roman Empire took it for granted that a pater familias had absolute authority and control over his Household. Thus, the secular examples of such "Household Codes" usually just indicated how slaves, children, or wives should act toward their masters, fathers, or husbands, respectively. They quite rarely also tell the adult men how they should treat the slaves, children, or wives who are members of their household.

According to author Felix Just, these New Testament texts do not give absolute power to the men. Instead, they require a high degree of responsibility and mutual respect from all members of Christian families, but "do not show the full equality of the various members of a household" compared to modern egalitarian views.

Manifesto for maintaining hierarchical attitudes
Timothy Gombis argues that in the Letter to the Ephesians, Paul of Tarsus was laying out "a manifesto for the New Humanity, painting in broad strokes a vision for how believers ought to conduct themselves in new creation communities". He believes the status quo in at least the Ephesians' world was patterned after the character of what he calls the "Old Humanity"—"selfish and self-destructive behavior" that was oriented according to that of its rulers.

In , Gombis says Paul gives a comprehensive view of what relationships ought to look like in the New Humanity. He continues, "The Haustafel, therefore, is a manifesto for the new creation people of God and does not merely have the modern notion of the nuclear family in view, though certainly it includes this. In short, it presents a comprehensive view of how relationships in what he terms "the New Humanity" should be structured.
Gombis writes:
"The Old Humanity has been corrupted by the malign influence of the powers and authorities, and the New Humanity—the Church—is the new creation people of God, created 'according to God in righteousness and holiness of the truth' (Eph. 4:24) and wholly oriented by the self-sacrificial love of Christ".

He finally concludes that Paul is not simply being socially conservative by maintaining a place for hierarchicalism, nor is he merely trying to shield early Christian communities from imperial pressure. Rather, Paul's "exhortations are radical in that they directly confront and subvert the social structures of [first century] contemporary society".

See also
 Gender roles in Christianity
 Christian views on marriage
 Christian views on the Old Covenant

References

Household
Christian terminology
Christian ethics in the Bible
Codes of conduct
Pauline Christianity
Biblical law